Rheinzabern is a small town in the south-east of Rhineland-Palatinate in Germany near the Rhine river.
Currently, Rheinzabern, that belongs to the District of Germersheim has approx. 5000 inhabitants living on an area of 12,75 square kilometres.

Rhenanae Tabernae
The Latin term "Rhenanae Tabernae" literally means "tavern" and "Rhine". Hence Rheinzabern was founded as a place of rest for travellers on Roman roads. Founded some 1950 years ago as "Rhenanae Tabernae" along a Roman road, it is known for its Samian ware production. Remnants of the production are still visible and there is a local museum dedicated to pottery and Roman culture.

Economy and infrastructure

Economy 
The village has a rural character and has been agricultural for a long time. Rheinzabern now presents itself as a residential community in the vicinity of the large economic areas of Rhine-Neckar and Karlsruhe. Rheinzabern has a solid infrastructure with many craft and agricultural businesses.

Traffic 
The village can be reached from the east via the Bundesstraße 9 and from the west, the connection via the A 65 motorway is the "Kandel-Mitte" exit.
Rheinzabern station is on Schifferstadt–Wörth railway and is served by the Karlsruhe Stadtbahn.

Partnership of cities 
A partnership is maintained with the five French communes of Chalmoux, Cronat, Mont, Saint-Aubin-sur-Loire and Vitry-sur-Loire (Communauté de communes entre Somme et Loire) in Burgundy.

Notable citizens 

 Paul Fagius (1504–1549), reformer
 Philipp von Pfeiffer (1830–1908), capitular in Speyer
 Maximilian Josef Pfeiffer (1875–1926), politician
 Anton Pfeiffer (1888–1957), politician (BVP, CSU) and diplomat
 Columba Baumgartner (1912–2007), abbess
 Reiner Marz (born 1958), politician (GRÜNE)
 Hans Kantereit (born 1959), author
 Philipp Jakob Gillmann, priest
 Elisabeth Langgässer (1899–1950), author
 Manuel Hornig (born 18 December 1982), soccer player
 Barbara Schleicher-Rothmund (born 14 February 1959), politician
 Florian Bauer (born 28 April 1982), musician
 Thomas Gebhart (born 1971, politician)

References

External links
Rheinzabern online 
  Project Via Rhenana - Roman road along the Upper Rhine

Germersheim (district)